Cheikha Rabia is an Algerian singer born in Relizane (near Oran) in Algeria.

Biography 
Born in Relizane in 1944, a city near Oran in Algeria, Rabia is the daughter of a barber (a veteran of World War I) and a seamstress from Kabylie. She began singing at 11 years old after discovering the traditional female Algerian singers called "Meddehates", who traditionally sing songs of lust, primarily performed in rural celebrations before an exclusively female audience. The songs were considered crude and unfit to be heard in polite society.  

The title of Cheikha (mistress of voice) was given to Cheikha Rabia when she was 18 years old. 'A new popular music was born between women voices playing percussion as the meddehates meet the flutes of 'cheikh' as Eliane Azoulay. Cheikha Rabia, one of the great Algerian voices expatriated in Paris was portrayed in 2001 by directors Stéphane Ballouhey, Bertrand Roelandt. Cheikha Rabia sings the Raï in a good authentic way, with two traditional flutes whose sound give off a Bedouin past.

Musical influences

Roots of raï 
From the 1960s, she sang in cabarets of Algiers where it is a huge success with an exclusively male audience. She immigrated to France in 1977 with her husband and eight children and started a new career in the French capital Paris, where she acquired a Bistrot in Paris while continuing to perform in small cabarets as a raï singer. After her divorce, a difficult period lay ahead, in order to focus on raising her children and she had no choice but to stop singing. Five years later, once her children grew up, she sold her café and began to sing on weekends. After several successful recordings in Algeria, she recorded an album in 1999 on Virgin with a powerful headline, 'ana hak', followed by a European tour. Cheikha Rabia combined the concert dates, alternating passages in renowned festivals as cultural centers in suburban bistros or prestigious venues. 'This music born in Oran and performed in Paris is deep rooted to desire gloomy feelings' as Véronique Mortaigne reviews. 'Isn't Rabia's singing the best omen to unite human minds? The sixty years old lady always sung love with a raw and passionate flame' as Farac C from l'Humanite review.

Rabia 
The idea for a new musical structure in the ray of Cheikha Rabia begins to growing up. Cheikha Rabia met producer musician Dinah Douieb in 2005 at a "Music Night of Ramadan in a Paris's Bistrot. Cheikha Rabia starts to realize how much her singularity of her voice and her personality is captizing new generations of rock musicians and electronic music producers. She signs with the label tiferet(e) in 2006 and records with Dinah a first album of Roots Raï 'Liberti 'release with Bouda musique. In 2012, at sixty eight old, Cheikha Rabia is recording a new album together, drawing inspiration from paradoxical Black Sabbath rock mixed with funk groove range from hip hop beats, drum and bass. The group includes the participation of the guitarist Yan Pechin and electric guitar & producer Dinah Douieb, bassist/remixer Niktus. A cross-over into raï with electronic music rock music. In the name of the Singer Cheikha Rabia there is  'RABIA' as Rage in Spanish and Spring in Arabic.

Discography 
 Ana Hak (1999)
 Liberti (2007)
 RABIA (2012)

References

External links
 bandcamp cheikharabia Official

Algerian emigrants to France
Living people
Raï musicians
1944 births
20th-century Algerian  women singers
21st-century Algerian  women singers
People from Relizane